Barry Stewart is a former Scotland international rugby union player. He played as a Prop.

Rugby Union career

Amateur career

He played for Edinburgh Academicals.

Professional career

He played for Edinburgh Rugby. He received a spinal injury which curtailed his Edinburgh and international career.

On the favourable advice of a neurosurgeon he decided to continue playing. He moved to play for Sale Sharks. In the 2005–2006 season, Stewart played as a replacement in the final as Sale Sharks won their first ever Premiership title.

He also played for Northampton Saints.

International career

He was capped 7 times for Scotland 'A' between 1996 and 2000.

He played for the full senior Scotland side and won five caps. First capped in June 1996, he was the last amateur era cap to debut for Scotland; as Scottish rugby union belatedly professionalised for season 1996-97, a year behind most other nations.

Journalistic career

He has contributed articles for the rugby union online site The Offside Line.

Business career

He is now an investment manager at Brewin Dolphin.

References

1975 births
Living people
Edinburgh Academicals rugby union players
People educated at Edinburgh Academy
Scotland international rugby union players
Edinburgh Rugby players
Scottish rugby union players
Scotland 'A' international rugby union players
Sale Sharks players
Northampton Saints players
Rugby union players from Edinburgh
Rugby union props